Christopher Mohr (born 12 January 1990, Frankfurt am Main) is a British handball player. At the 2012 Summer Olympics he competed with the Great Britain men's national handball team in the men's tournament.

Career
Mohr is half Scottish.

in 2009, Mohr played club handball for TUSEM Essen in the Handball-Bundesliga alongside five other British players. He prepared for the Olympics at a training camp in Denmark, whilst also working in a bakery. Following the Olympics, he returned to Denmark to continue playing and also appeared for Great Britain again during the 2014 European Men's Handball Championship qualification.

References

1990 births
Living people
Handball players at the 2012 Summer Olympics
Olympic handball players of Great Britain
British male handball players